She Learned About Sailors is a 1934 comedy film directed by George Marshall and starring Alice Faye, Lew Ayres, and Susan Fleming. The film is about a night club singer in Shanghai who falls in love with an American sailor. Songs for the film were written by Richard A. Whiting and Sidney Clare.

External links

1934 films
American black-and-white films
1934 comedy films
Films directed by George Marshall
American comedy films
Fox Film films
1934 drama films
1930s English-language films
1930s American films